Into The Mirror Live / Black Reflections is a live promotional EP of the band Sanctuary recorded on May 12, 1990 at The Country Club in Reseda, California, during their Into the Mirror Black tour. Approximately 1000 CD copies of this were made and less than 500 were ever distributed to radio stations and record stores. Because of contractual problems with Epic Records, the full version was never released for public consumption. Epic Records destroyed 500+ copies of this CD. Warrel Dane stated on several occasions that he owned the master tapes and copyrights of the full show, intending to have it finally released. Although the full show never emerged during Dane's lifetime, in 2020 it was finally announced that the show would be included, with a new mix, as a second CD on the 30th anniversary reissue of  Into the Mirror Black. The original CD has been heavily pirated over the years as a 2-on-1 CD with the Satan's Host "Metal From Hell" album on the notorious Reborn Classics record label.

Track listing

Track 1 is taken from the Sanctuary album Into the Mirror Black

Personnel

Sanctuary
 Warrel Dane – vocals     
 Lenny Rutledge – guitar    
 Sean Blosl – guitar 
 Jim Sheppard – bass     
 Dave Budbill – drums

Technical personnel
 Howard Benson – production, mixing (1)
 Bruce Barns – mixing (1)
 Biff Daws – engineering (2–6)
 Mike Carver – assistant engineering (2–6)
 Doug Field – assistant recording (2–6)
 Phil Kneebone – assistant recording (2–6)
 Richard Kimball – executive production (2–6)
 Joe Gastwirt – digital mastering (2–6)

1990 live albums
Sanctuary (band) albums